Mission Mountain or Mission Mountains may refer to:

Montana, US
 Mission Mountain Railroad, a shortline railroad
 Mission Mountain School, a former therapeutic boarding school for girls
 Mission Mountain Wood Band, an American bluegrass and country rock band
 Mission Mountains, a range of the Rocky Mountains
 Mission Mountains Wilderness, part of the National Wilderness Preservation System

Canada
 Mission Ridge (British Columbia) or Mission Mountain

See also
 
 
 Mission Hills (disambiguation)
 Mission Peak, in California
 Mission Ridge (disambiguation)
 Mission Terrace, in San Francisco, California